

The Grigorovich M-11 (or Shchetinin M-11) was a Russian single-seat fighter flying boat designed by Dmitry Pavlovich Grigorovich and built by Shchetinin

Design and development
Originally conceived as a two-seater the prototype M-11 was built in 1916 at the Shchetinin factory in Petrograd. The M-11 was a biplane with a 100 hp (75 kW) Gnome Monosoupape rotary engine with a pusher propeller strut-mounted below the upper wing.  The small number of two-seaters had a poor performance and were only used as trainers, Grigorovich developed a single-seat version powered a 110 hp (82 kW) Le Rhône engine and fitted with a forward firing machine gun in front of the cockpit. Originally 100 single-seat M-11s had been ordered but this was reduced to 60 as the aircraft had poor handling when landing or alighting on water.
The M-11 were operated from snow and ice with twin skis fitted under the forward fuselage and a single ski under the tailplane.

To improve the water handling an improved variant was developed as the M-12 which had a re-designed hull and reduced loaded weight. Although the climb to height was improved the forward speed was 5 mph (8 km/h) less than the M-11 consequentially only a few M-12s were built.

Variants
M-11 (two-seat)
Small numbers built for training use.
M-11 (single-seat)
Production variant, 60 built.
M-12
Improved version.

Operators

Estonian Air Force

Imperial Russian Navy

Soviet Naval Aviation

Specifications (M-11 single-seater)

See also

References

Bibliography
 Gerdessen, Frederik. "Estonian Air Power 1918 – 1945". Air Enthusiast, No. 18, April – July 1982. pp. 61–76. .

 

1910s Russian fighter aircraft
Flying boats
M-11
Biplanes
Single-engined pusher aircraft
Rotary-engined aircraft
Aircraft first flown in 1916